Deportivo Pereira is a professional Colombian football team based in Pereira, that currently plays in the Categoría Primera A. They play their home games at the Hernán Ramírez Villegas stadium.

History

Early years
While there are several amateur teams from the Risaralda Department in the Third Division (Primera C), Pereira is the department's only professional team. Deportivo Pereira was founded on 12 February 1944 by Pedro Patiño 'Peruco', Luis Carlos Marulanda, Rogelio Díaz 'Control', Faustino Chiquito y Gabriel Cardona Rojas, aiming to end the rivalry between the local clubs Deportivo Otún and Vidriocol. On 12 March 1944 they played their first game, facing Guadalajara de Buga at Estadio Alberto Mora Mora in Pereira.

Deportivo Pereira made its First Division debut (Primera A) in the 1949 season, replacing Universidad, a football club founded in Bogotá that had played its previous season in the Pearl of the Otún River, nickname of the city of Pereira, but moved back to Bogotá for that season. Precisely, the team played its first game against that same team, losing 2–1. The team's first goal was scored by Ecuadorian player Humberto Suárez. Its first victory was against Atlético Bucaramanga, with a final score of 2–1 and goals scored by Omar Barahona and José “Mico” Zapata. A second victory was obtained against Bucaramanga, this time away from home and by a score of 4–3. The team's first victory playing at home was on 9 October 1949, beating Huracán de Medellín 4–1, with goals scored by Carmelo Enrique Colombo, José "Mico" Zapata, Inocencio Paz Lasso "Cencio" and an own goal from Huracan's player Santos Isaza. The first top scorer of the "Matecaña" (another of Pereira's nicknames) team was the Colombian Inocencio Paz Lasso "Cencio", with 11 goals. The team finished the season in last place with only 14 points.

The team's most successful campaigns were in 1952, 1962, 1966, and 1974, in which the team placed third. However the most remembered team was the one that competed in the 1982 season which was led by Gilberto Osorio. Their roster included Óscar Héctor Quintabani, "Ratón" Echeverri, Víctor Longo, Henry Viáfara, Gilberto Cabrera, Farid Perchy, Sergio Cierra, Benjamin "Mincho" Cardona, Eduardo Emilio Vilarete, Jairo "Chiqui" Aguirre, and as substitutes goalkeeper Reynel Ruiz, midfielders Manzi and Ponciano Castro and strikers Abel Augusto Lobatón, Hernán "Pistolero" Villa and Iván Darío "Chumi" Castañeda. The team finished the tournament in fourth place.

Deportivo Pereira also gained recognition for the large number of Paraguayan players that have joined its ranks starting from its early years, beginning with the arrival of player and manager César López Fretes, who managed the team for seven seasons between 1964 and 1970. The first Paraguayan in the squad was striker Carmelo Enrique Colombo who arrived in 1949, and from that moment onwards over 100 Paraguayan footballers have played for Deportivo Pereira throughout its history. By 1951, 10 out of the 11 starting players were Paraguayans who had participated in the 1950 FIFA World Cup with their national team, including Enrique Ávalos, Marcelino Vargas, and López Fretes himself. Other outstanding Paraguayan players at Deportivo Pereira were Casimiro Ávalos, who is the club's all-time top scorer with 141 goals, Ángel Chávez who played 276 matches with the team, Apolinar Paniagua, Alcides Sossa and Benicio Ferreira, among several others who even established their permanent residency in the city.

First relegation and return to Primera A
In 1991, Colombia's Dimayor created the second tier tournament Categoría Primera B, granting its champion the chance to promote to the first division (which became Categoría Primera A) and replace the last-placed team from the league, which would be demoted to the second division. In 1995, the team got a decent sixth place that placed it comfortably far from the second tier. However, during the 1997 Adecuación tournament, the team was relegated to Primera B for the first time after a 3–2 win for Deportivo Unicosta against Millonarios.

Deportivo Pereira played in the second tier for three seasons between 1998 and 2000, placing as runners-up in 1998 behind Deportivo Pasto and third the following year. In 2000 they eventually won the Primera B tournament and returned to the top tier. In that season they were led by coach Walter Aristizábal and players such as Rafael Castillo, Guillermo Berrío, Hernán Darío Cardona, Daniel Vélez and Jairo Serna.

Ups and downs and second relegation
Since their return to the top flight for the 2001 season, Deportivo Pereira reached the semi-finals of the Primera A tournament five times: in the 2003 Apertura, 2005 Finalización, 2006 Apertura, 2008 Finalización, and 2009 Finalización. The best campaign of those was the 2008 one, in which the team managed by Luis Fernando Suárez advanced to the semi-finals in sixth place with 28 points and ended missing out on the final after placing second in their group behind the eventual champions América de Cali. In the final table of that tournament, Deportivo Pereira placed fourth, behind América, runners-up Independiente Medellín, and Deportes Tolima.

In spite of those good campaigns, Pereira were still troubled with relegation: in 2007, the team finished second to last in the relegation table and had to play a relegation playoff against the 2007 Primera B runners-up Academia. Deportivo Pereira were able to keep their place in Primera A, beating Academia 4–2 on aggregate thanks to striker Óscar Restrepo. The following year, they only avoided relegation on the last day of the regular season, defeating Atlético Bucaramanga 3–0 and sending them to the second tier instead, and in 2009 they had to play the relegation playoff again, beating Bucaramanga 5–3 on aggregate.

A democratization process of the club was started by the end of 2008. After several months of legal processes, the club was confirmed by the División Mayor del Fútbol Colombiano (Dimayor) and the Colombian Football Federation as Deportivo Pereira S.A., led by Luis Fernando Osorio Acevedo. However in September 2010 it returned to its previous owners, the López Bedoya family, as they argued that Osorio had failed to pay the agreed fee for their shares.

In the 2010 Finalización tournament, Deportivo Pereira failed to win a single game in the first stage, placing second-from-bottom with nine draws and nine losses, and the situation did not improve in the immediately following tournament, the 2011 Apertura, in which they only won one game out of 18 and placed last, that only victory being in the derby against Once Caldas where they broke a record 34-game winless streak. Although they had chances to qualify for the final stages of the 2011 Finalización tournament, those previous poor campaigns took their toll in the relegation table and Deportivo Pereira were relegated to Primera B for the second time on 5 November 2011 by losing 1–0 against Deportes Tolima in Ibagué.

Second spell in Primera B and administrative crisis
In the second tournament of the 2012 Primera B season, and under the leadership of manager Octavio Zambrano, Deportivo Pereira achieved a points record with a total of 43 points out of 54 possible obtained in a single season, making it the first team to have achieved this number in a single campaign. However, the club missed the chance to return to the top flight in the semi-finals.

On 29 October 2013, Coldeportes announced in a statement that it was withdrawing the sporting license (reconocimiento deportivo) of the Social, Sports and Cultural Corporation of Pereira (Corpereira), due to the recurrence of non-compliance with their labor obligations, reason for which Deportivo Pereira could not carry out any sports-related activity while said sanction was not lifted. Coldeportes had renewed the club's license after it entered bankruptcy law and committed to pay its debts within the deadlines set by law. However, when carrying out inspection and control, the government entity again found failures in the payment of salaries, social security and parafiscal contributions, which compelled them to withdraw Pereira's sporting license. Although attempts to create another team to represent the city due to Deportivo Pereira's administrative issues and potential dissolution were made, in November the club was able to pay nearly COP 180 million to its creditors to have its sanction lifted by Coldeportes. With their sporting license reinstated, Pereira were eventually able to compete in the 2014 season, in which they again failed to earn promotion.

In early 2015, Deportivo Pereira along with other seven traditional teams took part in a special promotion tournament in Bogotá, in which two teams would be promoted to the top flight which expanded to 20 teams starting from that season. However, they again failed to promote as they placed last in their group which was won by Cortuluá. In the Primera B tournament itself, they qualified for the semi-finals in second place with 60 points but failed to advance to the finals and earn promotion as they ended in second place of their group behind Fortaleza.

In 2016, Deportivo Pereira placed first in the regular stage of the Primera B tournament with 70 points in 32 matches, 22 wins, 4 draws and 6 losses, scoring 58 goals and conceding 28, for a 73% performance. In this tournament they got their biggest win in the second tier, thrashing Atlético F.C. 7–2 on 1 August. In the semi-finals, they played in Group A against Leones, Tigres, and Bogotá. This was the closest Deportivo Pereira were to clinch promotion, as they were defeating Leones 2–1 on the last round of the semi-finals and winning their group. However, a last-minute equalizer by the team from Itagüí ended up dashing Pereira's promotion hopes since Tigres defeated Bogotá to win the group as well as promotion to Primera A.

Promotion and first league title
Deportivo Pereira stayed in the second tier until the 2019 season in which they won both of the season's short tournaments and topped the aggregate table with 90 points, defeating Cortuluá in the Torneo Apertura finals and Boyacá Chicó in the Finalización finals to clinch their second Primera B title as well as direct promotion to the top flight.

Since their return to Primera A for the 2020 season, Deportivo Pereira have been able to avoid relegation consistently while also making some deep campaigns, losing the final of the Liguilla tournament to Millonarios in 2020. In 2021, and managed by their former player Alexis Márquez, Deportivo Pereira made history by qualifying for the finals of the Copa Colombia after beating Deportes Tolima in the semi-finals. There they faced Atlético Nacional, losing 5–1 on aggregate.

Under the managerial direction of Alejandro Restrepo, who replaced Alexis Márquez for the 2022 Finalización tournament, Deportivo Pereira qualified for their first Primera A championship final. The Matecañas, backed by the scoring prowess of striker Leonardo Castro as well as a strong campaign away from Pereira that saw them become the tournament's best away side by winning in Montería, Cali, Ibagué, Bogotá, and Bucaramanga during the first stage of the tournament, advanced to the semi-finals in fifth place with 32 points. For the semi-finals, they were drawn in Group A along with Bogotá sides Santa Fe and Millonarios as well as Junior from Barranquilla, advancing to their first final in the Colombian first division after a 2–0 win over Junior in Barranquilla and a 1–1 draw in the Bogotá derby on the last matchday of the semi-finals which allowed them to win Group A with 12 points and face Independiente Medellín in the tournament's final series. After a 1–1 draw in the first leg and a scoreless draw in the return leg played in Pereira, the Matecañas defeated Independiente Medellín 4–3 on a penalty shootout to claim their first Primera A title, as well as qualification for their first Copa Libertadores.

Stadium

Deportivo Pereira play their home matches at Estadio Hernán Ramírez Villegas, with a capacity of 30,297 and opened in 1971. From their foundation in 1944 to 1971, they played their home matches at Estadio Alberto Mora Mora also located in Pereira, in its Kennedy neighborhood to the east of the city. This stadium became known as El Fortín de Libaré ("Libaré's little fort") due to the strength that Deportivo Pereira came to acquire playing there, to the extent that visiting teams considered a draw there as a very good result.

Honours
Categoría Primera A:
Winners (1): 2022–II

Categoría Primera B:
Winners (2): 2000, 2019
Runners-up (1): 1998

 Copa Colombia:
Runners-up (1): 2021

 Superliga Colombiana:
Runners-up (1): 2023

Players

Current squad

Out on loan

Notable players

 Henry Viáfara (1973–1983)
 Luis Pompilio Páez (1981–1988)
 Abel Augusto Lobatón (1982–1985)
 César Cueto (1986)
 Mauricio Serna (1990)
 Eumelio Palacios (1992)
 Óscar Díaz (1993–1996), (1997)
 Rubén Darío Hernández (1994)
 Hólger Quiñónez (1996–1997)
 Jesús Sinisterra (1996–1997)
 Carlos Rodas (1996–1997)
 Vidal Sanabria (1997)
 Jhonny Acosta (2001–2004), (2006–2009), (2010)
 Danny Quendambú (2002)
 René Higuita (2002–2003), (2008–2009)
 Leonel Álvarez (2002–2003)
 Jair Benítez (2003)
 Ricardo Páez (2004)
 Milton Rodríguez (2004)
 Diego Arias (2004–2009)
 Gabriel Gómez (2005)
 Orlando Rodríguez (2005)
 Jersson González (2005–2006)
 Julián Estiven Vélez (2005–2006)
 Jorge Bermúdez (2006)
 Eduardo Hurtado (2007)
 Carlos Quintero (2008)
 Juan Martín Parodi (2008), (2010)
 Fernando Uribe (2009)
 Edison Giménez (2009)
 Edwin Tenorio (2009)
 Christian Lara (2009)
 Gustavo Victoria (2009–2012)
 Germán Cano (2011)
 Róbinson Zapata (2011)
 Freddy Grisales (2011)
 Jhon Viáfara (2011)
 Jorge Brítez (2011)
 Carlos Villagra (2011)
 Diego Vera (2011)
 Edwin Villafuerte (2012)

Managers

References

External links

Official website
Orgullo Pereirano
Lobo Sur Pereira

 
Pereira, Colombia
Football clubs in Colombia
Association football clubs established in 1944
1944 establishments in Colombia
Categoría Primera A clubs
Categoría Primera B clubs